Nicola Lo Buono (born 4 June 1933 in Bari, Italy) was an Italian football defender.

1933 births
2009 deaths
Serie A players
S.S. Lazio players
Delfino Pescara 1936 players
Association football defenders
Italian footballers